Bartica, Essequibo, is a town on the left bank of the Essequibo River in Cuyuni-Mazaruni (Region 7), at the confluence of the Cuyuni and Mazaruni Rivers with the Essequibo River in Guyana. It is the regional capital of Cuyuni-Mazaruni.

Considered the "Gateway to the Interior", the town has a population of 8,004 as of 2012, and is the launching point for people who work in the bush, mining gold and diamonds.

History
The town developed from an Anglican missionary settlement, established in 1837, and consecrated in 1843.  The name Bartica comes from an indigenous word meaning "red earth", abundant in the area.

Education
Bartica has two secondary school Bartica Secondary and Three Miles Secondary and three primary schools, St. Anthony's Primary and St. John-the-Baptist and Two Miles Primary.  There are several other primary schools in the surrounding riverine communities.

Health
The region 7 hospital is located in Bartica and is known for having implemented the country’s first electronic Health Information System in 2005, developed by Peace Corps volunteers Geoffrey Thompson and Jason Knueppel.

Tourism
Bartica can be reached from Parika, Essequibo and Linden, Demarara. The Denham Suspension Bridge, also known as the Garraway Stream Bridge, links Bartica to Mahdia.

North of Bartica lie the ruins of the Dutch fort Kyk-Over-Al, former government seat for the County of Essequibo. Bartica is also close to Marshall Falls.

There are several hotels in the town including the Platinum Inn, The New Modern Hotel, Balkarran's Guest House (D factor to D interior), and Zen's Plaza. There is also a thriving nightclub located in the Modern Hotel building.  Several Brazilians live in Bartica, so one can find Brazilian restaurants and bars.  There are several restaurants as well as local fast food joints including Sunset Boulevard, which is a perfect place to meet and have a bite while getting information from locals.  There are also several resorts around the Bartica area including Baganara, Shanklands (not open at the moment), Whitewater and a Guesthouse in Byderabo. From Bartica, persons can also gain access to pristine riverain communities to experience the true indigenous way of life.

During the Easter weekend every year, Bartica hosts the Bartica Regatta, with a growing variety of entertaining holiday activities including water sports (featuring mostly speed boats), cricket, boxing, soccer, talent shows, a street parade, and a Miss Bartica Regatta Pageant. The Regatta attracts people from all parts of Guyana, and even from other countries. There is also a summer Regatta, which is held annually in August.

Notable people
 Frank Bowling (1934-), an abstract painter.
 Dianne Ferreira-James (1970-), international FIFA referee
 Ivor Mendonca (1934-2014), a West Indian cricketer
 Kaysia Schultz (1997-), a West Indian cricketer

Massacre

On the 17th of February 2008 Bartica was allegedly attacked by Rondell Rawlins' heavily armed gang. Twelve people, including three policemen, were shot dead as the gang terrorized the town. The Bartica Police Station was overrun by the gunmen during the rampage and several business places robbed during the hour-long mayhem. The gang and attack is believed to linked to the Lusignan Massacre three weeks earlier. The perpetrators were killed on August 28, 2008 at one of their hideouts near the Guyanese capital Georgetown in a shootout with the police.

References

External links

 Bartica Massacre

Populated places in Cuyuni-Mazaruni